Kimbolton is a rural locality in the City of Greater Bendigo, in the state of Victoria.

References

Bendigo
Suburbs of Bendigo
Towns in Victoria (Australia)